Ruhleben internment camp was a civilian detention camp in Germany during World War I. It was located in Ruhleben, a former Vorwerk manor  to the west of Berlin, now split between the districts of Spandau and Charlottenburg-Wilmersdorf. The camp was originally a harness racing track laid out north of the Berlin-Hamburg Railway line in 1908.

Detainees

The camp detainees included male citizens of the Allied Powers living, studying, working or on holiday in Germany at the outbreak of World War I. They also included the crews of several civilian ships stranded in German harbours or captured at sea. As well, there were a number of fishermen captured from trawlers which had been sunk in the North Sea in the first days of the war: they were mainly men from Hull, Grimsby and Boston. Numbers in the camp varied between 4,000 and 5,500 prisoners, most of them British. Life in the camp was described in several books and essays subsequently written by detainees. They included To Ruhleben – And Back (1916) by Geoffrey Pyke, who had successfully escaped from the camp in 1915, and Life in Ruhleben, 1914–1918 (1920) by Frederick Keel. Quarters were cramped: the stable blocks averaged 27 stalls, each housing six men, and the stable block lofts each housed about 200 men.  

The German authorities adhered to the Geneva Convention and allowed the camp detainees to administer their own internal affairs. Gradually, a mini-society evolved.  Letters, books, sports equipment and a printing press were all allowed into the camp, and the detainees organised their own police force, magazine, library and postal service. The latter, known as the Ruhleben Express Delivery, was organised by Albert Kamps and began operating in July 1915. Soon it was handling over 6,000 pieces of mail per month, and 16 different postage stamps were issued which have since become collectors items. In April 1916, however, the German postal authorities declared the service illegal and it ceased operating. Prisoners grew their own fruit and vegetables, especially because fresh produce was hard to come by. That evolved into the Ruhleben Horticultural Society, which developed close links with the Royal Horticultural Society in London. In addition, a number of independent businesses developed within the camp, including a casino.

Arts and culture

The detainees arranged their own entertainment. Among them were several musicians, including Ernest MacMillan, later to become a conductor of the Toronto Symphony Orchestra. Other British musicians included Edgar Bainton, Edward Clark and the Australian-born Arthur Benjamin. MacMillan was a prominent member of the Ruhleben Musical Society, formed in 1915, and directed performances of The Mikado (with orchestra and costumes) and a pantomime version of Cinderella.  MacMillan transcribed the music for the former from memory with the help of four other musicians, including Benjamin Dale. Among those who attended these performances were James W. Gerard, the United States ambassador. The detainees also presented Trial by Jury, The Pirates of Penzance, The Yeomen of the Guard and The Gondoliers. MacMillan gave lectures on each of Beethoven's symphonies, which were followed by piano duet performances played by him together with Benjamin Dale. MacMillan was also a member of the Ruhleben Drama Society and acted in productions of Othello, Twelfth Night, Lady Windermere's Fan and The Importance of Being Earnest.

The artist Charles Freegrove Winzer was interned at the camp, and provided illustrations for the camp magazine. His detention was contested, because he worked for the French Red Cross, and had been visiting his sister in Germany with permission of the military authorities there. Some of his lithographs, depicting life in the camp, are now in the Australian War Memorial collection.

Sports

Sports also played a major role in the lives of the detainees. Among them were several former professional footballers, including three former England internationals, Fred Pentland, Samuel Wolstenholme and Steve Bloomer; a Scotland international, John Cameron; a German international, Edwin Dutton; and John Brearley, once of Everton and Tottenham Hotspur. The Ruhleben Football Association was formed with Pentland as chairman and Cameron as secretary. Cup and league competitions were organised with teams representing the individual camp barracks. Around 500 prisoners played in the football competitions. Several thousand spectators attended the bigger games. A series of exhibition and "international" matches were also organised. On 2 May 1915 an "England XI" featuring Pentland, Wolstenholme, Brearley and Bloomer played a "World XI" captained by Cameron. Towards the end of the war an international triangular tournament called the Coupe de Allies, featuring a "British XI", a "French XI" and a "Belgium XI", was organised.

Other sports such as cricket, rugby, tennis and golf were also popular within the camp. In May 1915 a "Ruhleben XI", featuring Bloomer and Brearley, played a "Varsities XI" in the Ruhleben Cricket League. In July 1916 a "Lancashire XI", featuring Bloomer, beat a "Yorkshire XI" that included Wolstenholme.

Notable detainees

F. Charles Adler
Edgar Bainton
John Balfour
Winthrop Pickard Bell
Arthur Benjamin
Steve Bloomer
Roland Bocquet
John Brearley
Henry Brose
John Cameron
Sir James Chadwick
Edward Clark
Israel Cohen
Benjamin Dale
Sefton Delmer
Dr Arthur Henry Douthwaite
William Huntley Drummond, 6th Earl of Perth
Edwin Dutton
Harry Edward
Sir Charles D. Ellis
Charles Fryatt
Francis Gribble
Percy Hartley
Percy Hull
Nico Jungmann
Frederick Keel
John D. Ketchum
Peter Carl Mackay, alias Prince Monolulu
Ernest MacMillan
Thomas Humphrey Marshall
John Cecil Masterman
George Merritt
Michael Pease
Fred Pentland
Matthew Stewart Prichard
Geoffrey Pyke
R. M. Smyllie
Fred Spiksley
Jascha Spivakovsky
Tom Sullivan
Samuel Wolstenholme

See also

 World War I prisoners of war in Germany
 List of prisoner-of-war camps in Germany
 List of concentration and internment camps
 Holzminden internment camp

References

Notes

Bibliography

 (contains a section on Henry Brose's memories of Ruhleben)

External links
Maurice Ettinghausen Collection of Ruhleben Civilian Internment Camp Papers, 1914-1937 at Harvard Law School Library
John Masterman Collection of Ruhleben Civilian Internment Camp Papers, 1914-1937 at Harvard Law School Library
John Davidson Ketchum's archival papers related to Ruhleben internment camp held at the University of Toronto Archives and Records Management Services
Ruhleben Internment Camp - A British community in war-time Germany
1936 Summer Olympics official report. Volume 2. pp. 827–36.
 The Ruhleben Story.
Ruhleben P.O.W. Camp Stamps
Sir Ernest MacMillan at Ruhleben
Ruhleben at National Library of Scotland
 The prisoners of war who grew 33,000 lettuces BBC News Magazine 29 July 2014
The prisoners of Ruhleben BBC 24 August 2014
Sunday Feature: The Ruhleben Legacy BBC Radio 3, 12 April 2020

Venues of the 1936 Summer Olympics
Olympic modern pentathlon venues
German Empire in World War I
Prisoner-of-war camps in Germany
World War I internment camps
World War I sites in Germany
Wartime association football
 
Internment camps in Germany